Mario Dumont (born May 19, 1970) is a Canadian television personality and former politician in Quebec, Canada. He was a Member of the National Assembly of Quebec (MNA), and the leader of the Action démocratique du Québec (ADQ), from 1994 to 2009. After the 2007 Quebec election, Dumont obtained the post of Leader of the Opposition in the National Assembly.

Following his party's poor showing in the 2008 Quebec election, he announced his resignation as ADQ leader, and subsequently joined the television network V to host a daily news and talk show, Dumont, which began in 2009. He left that network in 2012 to join the all-news channel LCN.

Biography
Dumont was born in Saint-Georges-de-Cacouna, Quebec. Dumont and his wife, Marie-Claude Barrette, have three children: Angela, Charles, and Juliette. Dumont obtained a Bachelor of Arts in Economics from Concordia University in 1993, and completed some graduate work at the Université de Montréal.

Political career

Quebec Liberal Party
Dumont bought his first membership card in the Liberal Party of Quebec at age 15. He stated to his school friends that in the future he would be Quebec's premier.
Dumont was a former President of the Liberal Party's Youth Commission, but had a falling out with the party following the rejection of the Allaire Report proposing maximalist powers for Quebec after the collapse of the Meech Lake Accord.

Dumont called himself and Michel Bissonnet, who preceded Dumont as leader of the Liberal youth wing, the first Liberal sovereigntists. This was the group that led the Liberal sovereigntist faction while Liberal premier Robert Bourassa remained unopposed.

Dumont organized the "Liberals for the No side," in the 1992 referendum on the Charlottetown Accord.

Action démocratique du Québec
Dumont and Liberal party insider Jean Allaire played a central role in the creation and development of the Action démocratique du Québec (ADQ) in 1994. He succeeded Allaire as leader after the latter resigned for health reasons.

Dumont was elected as an ADQ member of the National Assembly for Rivière du Loup in the 1994, 1998, 2003, 2007 and 2008 elections.

In the 1995 Quebec referendum, Dumont joined with Parti Québécois Premier Jacques Parizeau and Bloc Québécois leader Lucien Bouchard, who wooed him and with whom he remains close, in support of the sovereigntist campaign. Dumont revealed to Journalist Chantel Herbert and Jean Lapierre that they planned to use 1995 Quebec Referendum as a way to advocate for a new partnership between Quebec and Canada. However, Parizeau advocated for separation; so both Bouchard and Dumont followed his direction. In subsequent years, however he changed positions on the issue, arguing that the sovereignty question had been decided and that Quebecers had no desire to revisit it.

In the years that followed, the constitutional position of the ADQ changed to favour Quebec autonomism, supporting increased powers and responsibilities for Quebec while remaining within Canada. In practical terms, Dumont has supported the creation of a Quebec constitution, the change of the province's name to that of the "autonomous state of Québec", and the collection of all taxes by the provincial government, with the funds necessary for the federal government to fulfill its constitutional responsibilities being transferred to it by the province.

Since the 1998 provincial election, Dumont has distinguished himself primarily for his stances on economic issues, which are generally considered to be right of centre in the context of the predominantly social-democratic Quebec political scene. He advocates the payment of a cash allowance to parents who do not wish to make use of the province's $7 a day daycare program, changes to the provincial health system that would allow private for profit health care and private health insurance alongside the public system, the abolition of school boards, the encouragement of private education, a tougher criminal justice system, reductions in the size of the provincial bureaucracy, and the repayment of the province's $127 billion government debt.

Dumont was personally very popular, and for most of his career was far more popular than the ADQ as a whole. In fact, for many years, the ADQ tried to capitalize on Dumont's personal popularity by using the official name Action démocratique du Québec-Équipe Mario Dumont (Action démocratique du Québec-Team Mario Dumont). However, this didn't translate to support for his party; it never won much support in Montreal or the Outaouais.

2007 Quebec election
In the 2007 Quebec election, the ADQ won 41 seats with 31% of the popular vote, and formed the Official Opposition in the National Assembly. Prior to the dissolution of the National Assembly, the ADQ had held only five seats, and as a result did not have official party status. Despite becoming the Official Opposition, the ADQ was almost nonexistent in several of the province's major cities. It won almost no seats in Montreal, Gatineau, Saguenay, Longueuil, Laval and Sherbrooke. Tasha Kheiriddin argued that his result would have given right-of-centre currents swirling in Quebec politics.

2008 Quebec election
On October 23, 2008, two ADQ MNAs, André Riedl and Pierre-Michel Auger, crossed the floor to the governing Liberal Party, embarrassing Dumont. Quebec premier Jean Charest subsequently called a snap election for December 8, 2008. A Léger Marketing poll conducted between Friday, November 14 and Monday, November 17, showed the Liberals with 44% support, the PQ with 33%, and the ADQ with 15%.

The ADQ won a meagre seven seats (17% of the vote) in the election. Following this poor showing, Dumont retired from politics on election night.

Television career

At TQS' 2009 upfronts presentation, it was announced that Dumont would join the network in the fall as host of a daily news and information series, Dumont 360. The series launched in September 2009, shortly after the network was rebranded as V.

In 2012, Dumont moved to LCN and began a new show called Dumont.

Since 2018, he has also hosted his own radio show, Le retour de Mario Dumont, on QUB Radio.

Votes of confidence

Bibliography
L'Instinct Dumont, Denis Lessard (Quebec: Voix Paralleles, 2007)

Electoral record

|-

|-

|-

|-
|}

|-

|-

|-

|-

|-

|-
|}

References

External links

Genealogy : Mario Dumont

1970 births
Action démocratique du Québec MNAs
Concordia University alumni
French Quebecers
Living people
People from Rivière-du-Loup
Quebec political party leaders
Canadian television hosts
Quebecor people
21st-century Canadian politicians